Margaret Simons (born 1960) is an Australian academic, freelance journalist and author. She has written numerous articles and essays as well as many books, including a biography of Senate leader of the Australian Labor Party Penny Wong and Australian minister for the environment Tanya Plibersek. Her essay Fallen Angels won the Walkley Award for Social Equity Journalism. 

She is  an Honorary Fellow at the Centre for Advancing Journalism at the University of Melbourne.

Early life and education
Simons was born in the UK in 1960.

Simons has a doctorate in creative arts from the University of Technology, Sydney.

Career
In 2010 Simons co-founded, with Melissa Sweet, the community-funded news site YouComm News, run by the Public Interest Journalism Foundation based at Swinburne University of Technology. At this time, she was a research fellow at the Institute of Social Research at Swinburne, and also a Senior Associate of RMIT University.

She co-authored the memoirs of Malcolm Fraser, former Prime Minister of Australia (with Fraser), published in 2010.

She was the media reporter for Crikey and has been a regular media commentator in The Guardian. She has also written for The Age, The Sydney Morning Herald, Griffith Review, and The Monthly. For many years, she wrote the "Earthmother" gardening column for The Australian, and has also written gardening book and novels.

She was director of the Centre for Advancing Journalism and coordinator of the Master of Journalism degree at the University of Melbourne from 2012 to 2017, and served as Associate Professor of journalism at Monash University between 2017 and 2019.

From 2018 to 2021 Simons was a Director and Chair of Research at the Public Interest Journalism Initiative.

 Simons is an Honorary Fellow at the Centre for Advancing Journalism at Melbourne University.

Recognition
Simons was a finalist for a Walkley Award for journalism in 2007 for the story Buried in the Labyrinth, about the release of a paedophile into the community, published in Griffith Review. Her book The Content Makers – Understanding the Future of the Australian Media (2007) was longlisted for the 2008 Walkley Book Award for non-fiction.

In 2015 she won the Walkley Award for Social Equity Journalism for her essay Fallen Angels, published in The Monthly. The essay is an investigation of sex tourism in the Philippines and the children that have been abandoned there by their Australian fathers. The award was shared with photographer Dave Tacon.

Her book, Penny Wong, a biography of Penny Wong, Senate leader of the Australian Labor Party, was longlisted for the 2020 Walkley Book Award.

Selected works
 
 The Truth Teller (1996)
 Wheelbarrows, Chooks & Children: a gardener's life (1999)
 Fit to Print: inside the Canberra Press Gallery (1999)
 The Meeting of the Waters: the Hindmarsh Island affair (2003)
 Latham's World: the new politics of the outsiders (2004)
 The Rich and Fertile Story of Compost: resurrection in a bucket (2004)
 The Content Makers: understanding the media in Australia (2007)
 Faith, Money & Power: what the religious revival means for politics (2007)
 Malcolm Fraser: the political memoirs (with Malcolm Fraser) (2010)
 
 Duty of Care, August 2010, The Monthly
 Journalism at the Crossroads: crisis and opportunity for the press (2012)
 Kerry Stokes: self made man (2013)
 Six Square Metres: reflections from a small garden (2015)
 Fallen Angels, July 2015, The Monthly
 The Long Letter to a Short Love, or..., Summer 2015, Meanjin
 Right Wing Refugee, January 2016, SBS
 Lost Boy Found, June 2016, SBS
 Is Michelle Guthrie Tuned in to the ABC?, September 2016, The Monthly
 Penny Wong: passion and principle (2019)
 Cry Me a River: The Tragedy of the Murray-Darling Basin, March 2020, Quarterly Essay
 Tanya Plibersek: On Her Own Terms (2023)

References

Living people
1960 births
Australian freelance journalists
Griffith Review people
University of Technology Sydney alumni
Academic staff of the University of Melbourne
Academic staff of Monash University